Bear Valley may refer to:
United States
 Bear Valley, Arizona a valley in Santa Cruz County, Arizona
 Bear Valley, Alpine County, California, USA
 Bear Valley (resort), a ski resort near Bear Valley in Alpine County, California
 Bear Valley, Colusa County, California, USA, between Leesville and Wilbur Springs, CA
 Bear Valley, Mariposa County, California, USA
 An alternate term for Big Bear Valley, in San Bernardino County, California, USA
 Bear Valley, Minnesota, an unincorporated community in southeast Minnesota, USA
 Bear Valley (Oregon), between John Day and Burns in eastern Oregon, USA
 Bear Valley, Wisconsin, an unincorporated community and surrounding valley in southwestern Wisconsin, USA
 Bear Valley (Anchorage), the name given to the far southeastern corner of Anchorage, Alaska